Burkin is a Russian masculine surname, its feminine counterpart is Burkina. Notable people with the surname include:

Yuli Burkin (born 1960), Russian science fiction writer and musician

See also
Berkin

Russian-language surnames